Lee So-yeon (born 19 July 1981) is a South Korean judoka. She won a bronze medal at the 2001 world championships in Munich  and a silver medal at the 2006 Asian Games.  Both times she competed in the -78 kg category.

References 

1981 births
Living people
Place of birth missing (living people)
Asian Games medalists in judo
Judoka at the 2006 Asian Games
South Korean female judoka
Asian Games silver medalists for South Korea
Medalists at the 2006 Asian Games
Judoka at the 2004 Summer Olympics
Judoka at the 2000 Summer Olympics
Universiade medalists in judo
Universiade silver medalists for South Korea
Olympic judoka of South Korea
Medalists at the 2007 Summer Universiade
21st-century South Korean women